Jorge Alberto Salas Chávez (17 July 1914 – 24 June 1992) was an Argentinian sailor. Born in Buenos Aires, he competed at five Olympics between 1948 and 1972.

He won silver at age 46 at the 1960 Olympics in the Mixed Three Person Keelboat (Dragon class), with Héctor Calegaris and his cousin Jorge del Río Sálas.  His team had come fourth in the same event four years earlier.

He is related to the Sieburger sailing clan by marriage, as his cousin Jorge del Río married Marilyn Sieburger, daughter of Enrique Sieburger, Sr. The extended Sieburger-Salas family has twenty Olympic appearances between them.

See also
 List of athletes with the most appearances at Olympic Games

References

External links
 

1914 births
1992 deaths
Argentine male sailors (sport)
Olympic sailors of Argentina
Olympic silver medalists for Argentina
Olympic medalists in sailing
Medalists at the 1960 Summer Olympics
Sailors at the 1948 Summer Olympics – Dragon
Sailors at the 1956 Summer Olympics – Dragon
Sailors at the 1960 Summer Olympics – Dragon
Sailors at the 1964 Summer Olympics – Dragon
Sailors at the 1972 Summer Olympics – Dragon
Argentine people of Spanish descent